Bready is a small village in County Tyrone, Northern Ireland. In the 2001 Census it had a population of 93 people. It lies within the Strabane District Council area.

Churches
St John's (Church of Ireland) Church, Dunnalong, built in 1865 and with a steeply pitched roof, is a Grade B1 listed building situated on the main Derry to Strabane road in Bready.
Bready Reformed Presbyterian Church

Sport 
Bready Cricket Club first entered junior league and cup competitions in the North-West of Ireland in 1938. To mark the opening of a new pavilion in 1987, a Viv Richards XI played an Ian Botham XI at Bready. In 1996, the club won the North West Senior Cup. In May 2015, International Cricket Council cleared the ground to host shorter format of cricket. The ground hosted its first international cricket match when home team Ireland played against Scotland in three Twenty20 International matches in June 2015.

The ground hosted its first Twenty20 International match, between Ireland and Hong Kong, on 5 September 2016.

References 

Villages in County Tyrone